The type III interferon group is a group of anti-viral cytokines, that consists of four IFN-λ (lambda) molecules called IFN-λ1, IFN-λ2, IFN-λ3 (also known as IL29, IL28A and IL28B respectively), and IFN-λ4. They were discovered in 2003. Their function is similar to that of type I interferons, but is less intense and serves mostly as a first-line defense against viruses in the epithelium.

Genomic location 
Genes encoding this group of interferons are all located on the long arm of chromosome 19 in human, specifically in region between 19q13.12 and 19q13.13. IFNL1 gene, encoding IL-29, is located downstream of IFNL2, encoding IL-28A. IFNL3, encoding IL28B, is located downstream of IFNL4.

In mice, the genes encoding for type III interferons are located on chromosome 7 and the family consist only of IFN-λ2 and IFN-λ3.

Structure

Interferons 
All interferon groups belong to class II cytokine family which have a conserved structure that comprises six α-helices. The proteins of type III interferon group are highly homologous and show high amino acid sequence similarity between. The similarity between IFN-λ2 and IFN-λ3 is approximately 96%, similarity of IFNλ1 to IFNλ 2/3 is around 81%. Lowest similarity is found between IFN-λ4 and IFN-λ3 - only around 30%. Unlike type I interferon group, which consist of only one exon, type III interferons consist of multiple exons.

Receptor 
The receptors for these cytokines are also structurally conserved. The receptors have two type III fibronectin domains in their extracellular domain. The interface of these two domains forms the cytokine binding site. The receptor complex for type III interferons consists of two subunits - IL10RB (also called IL10R2 or CRF2-4) and IFNLR1 (formerly called IL28RA, CRF2-12).

In contrast to the ubiquitous expression of receptors for type I interferons, IFNLR1 is largely restricted to tissues of epithelial origin. Despite high homology between type III interferons, the binding affinity to IFNLR1 differ, with IFN-λ1 showing the highest binding affinity, and IFN-λ3 showing the lowest binding affinity.

Signalling pathway 
IFN-λ production is induced by pathogen sensing through pattern recognition receptors (PRR), including TLR, Ku70 and RIG-I-like. The main producer of IFN-λ are type 2 myeloid dendritic cells.

IFN-λ binds to IFNLR1 with a high affinity, which then recruits the low-affinity subunit of the receptor, IL10Rb. This interaction creates a signalling complex. Upon binding of the cytokine to the receptor, JAK-STAT signalling pathway gets activated, specifically JAK1 and TYK2 and phosphorylate and activate STAT-1 and STAT-2, which then induces downstream signalling that leads to induction of expression of hundreds of IFN-stimulated genes (ISG), e.g.: NF-κB, IRF, ISRE, Mx1, OAS1.

The signalling is modulated by suppressor of cytokine signalling 1 (SOCS1) and ubiquitin-specific peptidase 18 (USP18).

Function 
Functions of type III interferons overlap largely with that of type I interferons. Both of these cytokine groups modulate the immune response after a pathogen has been sensed in the organism, their functions are mostly anti-viral and anti-proliferative. However, type III interferons tend to be less inflammatory and show a slower kinetics than type I. Also, because of the restricted expression of IFNLR1, the immunomodulatory effect of type III interferons is limited.

Because the receptors for type I and type II interferons are expressed on almost all nucleated cells, their function is rather systemic. Type III interferon receptors are expressed more specifically on epithelial cells and some immune cells such as neutrophils, and depending on the species, B cells and dendritic cells as well. Therefore, their antiviral effects are most prominent in barriers, in gastrointestinal, respiratory and reproductive tracts. Type III interferons usually act as the first line of defense against viruses at the barriers.

In the gastrointestinal tract, both type I and type III interferons are needed to effectively fight reovirus infection. Type III interferons restrict the initial replication of the virus and diminish the shedding of through feces, while type I interferons prevent the systematic infection.  On the other hand, in the respiratory tract these two groups of interferons seem to be rather redundant, as documented by the susceptibility of double-deficient mice (in receptors for type I and type III interferons), but the resistance to respiratory virus in mice that are deficient in either type I or type III interferon receptors. Additional gastrointestinal viruses such as rotavirus and norovirus, as well as non-gastrointestinal viruses like influenza and West Nile virus, are also restricted by type III interferons.

References 

Cytokines
Antiviral drugs